Federico Gastón Fernández (born 17 October 1989) is an Argentine handball player for UNLu and the Argentina men's national handball team.

He represented Argentina at the 2012 London Summer Olympics and the 2015 World Men's Handball Championship in Qatar. His brother, Juan Pablo, represented Argentina at the 2016 Olympics.

Individual achiviements
2018 International Tournament of Spain: Top scorer
2018 Pan American Men's Handball Championship: Best left wing
2022 South and Central American Men's Club Handball Championship: Top scorer

References

External links

1989 births
Living people
Argentine male handball players
Olympic handball players of Argentina
Handball players at the 2012 Summer Olympics
Handball players at the 2016 Summer Olympics
Sportspeople from Buenos Aires
Handball players at the 2011 Pan American Games
Handball players at the 2015 Pan American Games
Handball players at the 2019 Pan American Games
Pan American Games medalists in handball
Pan American Games gold medalists for Argentina
Pan American Games silver medalists for Argentina
South American Games silver medalists for Argentina
South American Games medalists in handball
Competitors at the 2018 South American Games
Medalists at the 2015 Pan American Games
Medalists at the 2019 Pan American Games
Medalists at the 2011 Pan American Games
Handball players at the 2020 Summer Olympics
21st-century Argentine people